Capitol South is a Washington Metro station in the Capitol Hill neighborhood of Washington, D.C., United States. The island-platformed station was opened on July 1, 1977, and is operated by the Washington Metropolitan Area Transit Authority (WMATA). The station currently provides service for the Blue, Orange, and Silver Lines.

History
The station opened on July 1, 1977. Orange Line service to the station began upon the line's opening on November 20, 1978.

The station was painted white sometime in the 2000s.

Silver Line service at Capitol South began on July 26, 2014.

Between January 15 to January 21, 2021, this station was closed because of security concerns due to the 2020 Inauguration.

Location
Capitol South is located in the south-central section of the Capitol Hill neighborhood of Washington, D.C. As such, it is surrounded by a wealth of government offices and buildings. Most importantly, it is the closest station to the Capitol Building which holds the Senate and House of Representatives. All three buildings of the Library of Congress are within a quarter-of-a-mile radius of Capitol South as are the Democratic National Committee and Republican National Committee headquarters. The Folger Shakespeare Library, the world's largest collection of printed Shakespearean works is a five-minute walk west from the station.

Station layout 
There is only one entrance to the station located on the southwestern corner at the intersection of 1st Street SE and C Street SE. A row of three escalators and a staircase brings passengers to the station's mezzanine level, where they may buy tickets from vending machines and pass through the faregates. Once passengers pass through these faregates, a pair of escalators brings passengers onto the platform. There are two elevators for handicapped passengers, one from street level to the mezzanine on the northwestern corner at the intersection of 1st Street SE and D Street SE and another between the mezzanine and platform.

Capitol South station utilises an island platform layout with two tracks, D1 and D2. Eastbound trains to New Carrollton or Downtown Largo use track D1 whilst westbound trains to Vienna, Franconia–Springfield, or Ashburn use track D2.

Notable places nearby
United States Capitol
Cannon House Office Building
Longworth House Office Building
Rayburn House Office Building
United States Botanic Garden
Democratic National Committee
Republican National Committee

References

External links
 

 The Schumin Web Transit Center: Capitol South Station
 1st Street entrance from Google Maps Street View

Stations on the Blue Line (Washington Metro)
Stations on the Orange Line (Washington Metro)
Stations on the Silver Line (Washington Metro)
Washington Metro stations in Washington, D.C.
Railway stations in the United States opened in 1977
1977 establishments in Washington, D.C.
Capitol Hill
Railway stations located underground in Washington, D.C.